The 1959 All-Big Eight Conference football team consists of American football players chosen by various organizations for All-Big Eight Conference teams for the 1959 NCAA University Division football season.  The selectors for the 1959 season included the Associated Press (AP) and the United Press International (UPI).  Players selected as first-team players by both the AP and UPI are designated in bold.

All-Big Eight selections

Backs
 Gale Weidner, Colorado (AP-1; UPI-1 [quarterback])
 Dwight Nichols, Iowa State (AP-1; UPI-1 [tailback])
 Prentice Gautt, Oklahoma (AP-1; UPI-1 [fullback])
 Bobby Boyd, Oklahoma (AP-1)
 Curtis McClinton, Kansas (UPI-1 [halfback])

Ends
 John Peppercorn, Kansas (AP-1; UPI-1)
 Russell Sloan, Missouri (AP-1; UPI-1)

Tackles
 Mike Magac, Missouri (AP-1; UPI-1)
 John Stolte, Kansas State (UPI-1)

Guards
 Jerry Thompson, Oklahoma (AP-1 [tackle]; UPI-1)
 Don Olson, Nebraska (AP-1; UPI-1)
 Joe Romig, Colorado (AP-1) (College Football Hall of Fame)

Centers
 Fred Hageman, Kansas (AP-1; UPI-1)

Key
AP = Associated Press

UPI = United Press International

See also
1959 College Football All-America Team

References

All-Big Seven Conference football team
All-Big Eight Conference football teams